Hotu may refer to:
 Hotu Matu'a, legendary first settler of Easter Island
 The Yellow River Map

The acronym HOTU may stand for:
 Home of the Underdogs, an abandonware website
 Neverwinter Nights: Hordes of the Underdark, an expansion pack for the computer game Neverwinter Nights